Pentametrocrinidae is a family of echinoderms belonging to the order Comatulida.

Genera:
 Pentametrocrinus Clark, 1908
 Thaumatocrinus Carpenter, 1883

References

Comatulida
Echinoderm families